Yuragiin Sainkhüü (born 14 November 1986) is a Mongolian international footballer. He made his first appearance for the Mongolia national football team in 2007.

He also played for the Mongolia men's national handball team at the 2010 Asian Games as a left wing.

References

1986 births
Living people
Mongolian footballers
Mongolia international footballers
Erchim players
Association football goalkeepers
Asian Games competitors for Mongolia
Handball players at the 2010 Asian Games
Mongolian National Premier League players
21st-century Mongolian people